Beya (Khakas: Пии, Pii) is a rural locality (a selo) and the administrative center of Beysky District of the Republic of Khakassia, Russia. Population:

References

Notes

Sources

Rural localities in Khakassia